Nubkheperre Intef (or Antef, Inyotef, sometimes referred to as Intef VI) was an Egyptian king of the Seventeenth Dynasty of Egypt at Thebes during the Second Intermediate Period, when Egypt was divided by rival dynasties including the Hyksos in Lower Egypt.

Rise to power
He is known to be the brother of Sekhemre-Wepmaat Intef—and this king's immediate successor—since he donated Louvre Coffin E3019 for this king's burial which bears an inscription that it was donated for king Sekhemre Wepmaat Intef "as that which his brother, king Antef (Nubkheperre Intef here) gives", notes Kim Ryholt. As the German scholar Thomas Schneider writes in the 2006 book Ancient Egyptian Chronology (Handbook of Oriental Studies):
From the legend on the coffin Louvre E 3019 (Sekhemre-Wepmaat's coffin), it follows that Inyotef Nebukheperre'...arranged the burial of his brother Inyotef Sekhemre'-upimaat...and must have therefore have followed him on the throne. In his Untersuchungen, Beckerath had viewed Inyotef Sekhemre'-upimaat (VI) and Inyotef Sekhemre-herhermaat (VII) as brothers, whereas he had separated Inyotef Nebukheperre' (VI; coffin BM 6652) from them as a king he considered not necessarily related to them, placing him at the beginning of the dynasty. Ryholt equally bases his arguments upon a consistent paleographic peculiarity (the Pleneschreibung of "j") in the case of the coffin of Inyotef Sekhemre-herhermaat. where only Nubkheperre Intef's nomen contained a reed-leaf of all the three Intef kings."

Intef's father
Nubkheperre Intef and, by implication, his brother Sekhemre Wepmaat Intef, were probably the sons of Sekhemre Shedtawy Sobekemsaf (Sobekemsaf II today) on the basis of inscriptions found on a doorjamb discovered in the remains of a 17th Dynasty temple at Gebel-Antef on the Luxor-Farshut road. The British Egyptologist Aidan Dodson also endorses Ryholt's interpretation of the doorjamb's text and writes: 
Ryholt does...introduce the new "Desert Roads" evidence from the Darnells' survey to show that Nubkheperrre Inyotef (dubbed by Ryholt "Inyotef N") was a son of [Sekhemre-shedtawi] Sobekemsaf, thus providing a key genealogical link within the [17th] dynasty.

The German Egyptologist Daniel Polz, who discovered this king's tomb in 2001, also studied the same doorjamb and reached a similar conclusion in a 2007 German language book. An association between Nubkheperre Intef and a king Sobekemsaf is also indicated by the discovery of a doorframe fragment by John and Deborah Darnell in the early 1990s which preserved part of an inscription naming a king Intef ahead of a king Sobekemsaf; the hieroglyphic spelling of the king Intef here was that used only by Nubkheperre. Unfortunately, not enough of the inscription was uncovered to reveal the nature of the relationship with any certainty here—or which king Sobekemsaf was intended. Nubkheperre Intef is sometimes referred to as Intef VII, in other sources as Intef VI, and even as Intef V.

Nubkheperre Intef ruled from Thebes, and was buried in a tomb in the necropolis of Dra' Abu el-Naga'. The grave was originally covered with a small pyramid (approximately 11 m at the base, rising to a height of approx. 13 m.) Auguste Mariette found two broken obelisks with complete Fivefold Titulary, which was then subsequently lost when being transported to the Cairo Museum.

King Intef's wife was Sobekemsaf, who perhaps came from a local family based at Edfu. On an Abydos stela mentioning a building of the king are the words king's son, head of the bowmen Nakht.

Building program 

Nubkheperre Intef is one of the best attested kings of the 17th dynasty who restored numerous damaged temples in Upper Egypt as well as constructing a new temple at Gebel Antef. The best preserved building from his reign is the remains of a small chapel at Koptos. Four walls that have been reconstructed show the king in front of Min and show him crowned by Horus and by another god. The reliefs are executed in raised and sunken relief. At Koptos, the Coptos Decree was found on a stela which referred to the actions of Nubkheperre Intef against Teti, son of Minhotep. At Abydos, several stone fragments were found, including columns which attest to some kind of restoration work. On a stela found at Abydos, a mention is made of a House of Intef. This most likely refers to a building belonging to Nubkheperre Intef. Therefore, while Nubkheperre Intef's highest—and only known—year date is his Year 3 on the Koptos stela, this must be considered an underestimate since he must have ruled much longer to accomplish his ambitious building program and also complete his royal tomb. Indeed, Nubkheperre Intef is alone "mentioned on over twenty contemporary monuments" from his reign which demonstrates his position as one of the most powerful rulers of the Seventeenth Dynasty of Egypt.

Nubkheperre Intef's timeline
Both Kim Ryholt and the German Egyptologist Daniel Polz concur that this pharaoh did not rule at or near the start of the 17th dynasty but rather late into the 17th dynasty just prior to the final three known kings of this dynasty (Senakhtenre, Seqenenre and Kamose.) Ryholt, however, in his 1997 reconstruction of the sequence of 17th dynasty rulers felt that a king Sobekemsaf intervened between the last Intef king and Senakhtenre.  whereas in more contemporary literature, Detlef Franke rejects this view (below) and argues that there is no space for a king Sobekemsaf to intervene in the space after Nubkheperre Intef. "Contrary to Ryholt, I see no place for a king Sobekemsaf who ruled after Nubkheperra Antef. Nubkheperra Antef (c.1560 BC) is the best attested (from Abydos to Edfu, e.g. BM 631, EA 1645, coffin 6652) and [the] most important of the three Antefs."

Polz, in his 2007 book, places Sekhemre-Heruhirmaat Intef as a short-lived king between the reigns of Nubkheperre Intef and Senakhtenre Ahmose—the first ruler of the Ahmoside family of kings.

Tomb Robbery and Rediscovery

Nubkheperre Intef's tomb was originally penetrated by tomb robbers in 1827 but some of its treasures made it into the hands of Western collectors; his unique rishi style coffin was purchased by the British Museum from the Henry Salt collection where its catalogue number is EA 6652.

His tomb was later found by early Egyptologists around 1881 but knowledge of its location was lost again until it was rediscovered in 2001 by German scholars under Daniel Polz, the deputy director of the German Archaeological Institute in 2001. The coffin of Nubkheperre Intef was reportedly found in his tomb complete with a diadem or crown, some bows and arrows, and the heart-scarab of a king Sobekemsaf.

References

Bibliography

External links

 Article on Excavation (in German)
 Digital Egypt link

16th-century BC Pharaohs
Pharaohs of the Seventeenth Dynasty of Egypt